is a Japanese actor and voice actor who works for Arts Vision. He is married to Yūko Kobayashi.

Filmography

Television animation
Kyojin no Hoshi (xxxx) (Tetsuharu Kawakami)
Touch (1985) (Ishigaki, Nagao)
Magical Emi, the Magic Star (1985) (Okubo)
Grimm's Fairy Tale Classics (1988) (Servant)
Mobile Suit Gundam 0080: War in the Pocket (1989) (Andy)
Brave Exkaiser (1990) (Dash Max)
Kekko Kamen (1991) (Teacher Ben)
The Brave Fighter of Legend Da-Garn (1992) (Jumbo Saber)
Black Jack (1993) (Soldier)
Brave Police J-Decker (1994) (Dumpson, Daisaku Omura)
Slayers (1995) (Innkeeper)
Agent Aika (1997) (Bodyguard)
Rurouni Kenshin: Tsuiokuhen (1999) (Katagai)
Pecola (2001) (Gao-san)
Ghost in the Shell: Stand Alone Complex (2002) (Sakakibara)
Heat Guy J (2002) (Alan Milchan)
Hikaru no Go (2003) (Hirose, many others)
Uninhabited Planet Survive! (2004) (Bob)
Gallery Fake (2005) (Seiji Fujita)
Kamichu! (2005) (Kenkichi Hitotsubashi)
D.Gray-man (2006) (Jake Russell)
Coyote Ragtime Show (2006) (Chief)
The Story of Saiunkoku (2006) (Governor of Haku Province)
Yomigaeru Sora – Rescue Wings (2006) (Ryunosuke Murakami)
Devil May Cry (2007) (Bartender, Fredi)
Spice and Wolf (2008) (Clothing Shop Owner)
Stitch! (2009) (Kantoku)
One Piece (2009) (Magellan)
Kuroshitsuji II (2010) (Arnold Trancy)
Steins;Gate (2011) (Eisuke Urushibara)
The Idolmaster (2011) (Reporter Yoshizawa)
Blue Exorcist (2011) (Hoshino)
Gintama (2011) (Admiral Abo)
AKB0048: Next Stage (2013) (Tokusan)
The Heroic Legend of Arslan (2015) (Zaravant)
Gate: Jieitai Kano Chi nite, Kaku Tatakaeri (2015) (US President Dirrel)
The Idolmaster Cinderella Girls (2015) (Reporter Yoshizawa)
Plastic Memories (2015) (Mikijiro Tetsuguro)
Active Raid (2016) (Kazuyoshi Terao)
100% Pascal-sensei (2017) (Head teacher)
Violet Evergarden (2018) (Le Verrier)
Banana Fish (2018) (Jim Callenreese)
Mob Psycho 100 II (2019) (Masashi Asagiri)
King of Prism: Shiny Seven Stars (2019) (Yō Takahashi)
Beastars (2019) (Mayor)
Healin' Good Pretty Cure (2020-2021) (Kawai)
Komi Can't Communicate (2021) (Masayoshi Komi)

Animated films
Mobile Suit Gundam: Char's Counterattack (1988) (Officer)
Venus Wars (1989) (Manuel)
Black Jack: The Movie (1996) (Eric Caderi)

Video games
Lego Island (1997) (Enter)
Tenchu (xxxx) (Balmer)
Valkyrie Profile (xxxx) (Badluck, Surt)

Drama CD
 Beauty Pop (xxxx) (Seiji Koshiba)

Tokusatsu
 Seijuu Sentai Gingaman (1998) (Houretsudo (ep. 21))
 Kamen Rider Den-O (2007) (Bluebird Imagin (31 - 32))
 Samurai Sentai Shinkenger (2009) (Ayakashi Sasamatage (ep. 20))
 Tensou Sentai Goseiger (2010) (Matroid Adoborute-G of the Vital (ep. 37))

Dubbing

Live-action
Albino Alligator (Milo (Gary Sinise))
Aliens in the Attic (Stu Pearson (Kevin Nealon))
American Pie series (Noah Levenstein (Eugene Levy))
Annabelle: Creation (Samuel Mullins (Anthony LaPaglia))
Antarctic Journal (Sung-hoon (Yoon Je-moon))
Apollo 13 (Fred Haise (Bill Paxton))
At the End of the Tunnel (Guttman (Federico Luppi))
Battleship (Air Force Chief of Staff (Gary Grubbs))
Braveheart (Hamish (Brendan Gleeson))
Bulworth (Dennis Murphy (Oliver Platt))
Call Me by Your Name (Mr. Perlman (Michael Stuhlbarg))
Captain Phillips (Mike Perry (David Warshofsky))
The Cat in the Hat (The Cat in the Hat (Mike Myers))
City Slickers II: The Legend of Curly's Gold (Glen Robbins (Jon Lovitz))
Close Encounters of the Third Kind: The Final Cut (David Laughlin (Bob Balaban))
Dangerous Beauty (Maffio Venier (Oliver Platt))
Desperate Measures (Nate Oliver (Erik King))
The Doors (John Densmore (Kevin Dillon))
Drag Me to Hell (Mr. Jim Jacks (David Paymer))
Fantastic Four (2008 NTV edition) (Ernie (David Parker))
Frailty (Dad Meiks (Bill Paxton))
Haven (Carl Ridley (Bill Paxton))
Henry Poole Is Here (Father Salazar (George Lopez))
High Noon (2021 Star Channel edition) (Mayor Jonas Henderson (Thomas Mitchell))
Idlewild (Rooster (Big Boi))
Independence Day: Resurgence (Dr. Isaacs (John Storey))
The Man (Andy Fiddler (Eugene Levy))
Memento (Burt (Mark Boone Junior))
Noel (Dr. Baron (John Doman))
Odd Thomas (Wyatt Porter (Willem Dafoe))
Once Upon a Time in Mexico (Cucuy (Danny Trejo))
Overdrive (Jacomo Morier (Simon Abkarian))
Panic (Josh (John Ritter))
Real (Dr. Choi Jin-ki (Lee Sung-min))
Space Jam (Shawn Bradley)
A Star Is Born (Lorenzo Campana (Andrew Dice Clay))
Star Trek: The Next Generation (Geordi La Forge (LeVar Burton))
Star Trek: First Contact (Geordi La Forge (LeVar Burton))
Star Trek: Insurrection (Geordi La Forge (LeVar Burton))
The Terminal (Joe Mulroy (Chi McBride))
The Thomas Crown Affair (Detective Michael McCann (Denis Leary))
Wind Chill (Pickup Driver (Ned Bellamy))

Animation
Clifford the Big Red Dog (Clifford)
Clifford's Really Big Movie (Clifford)
Teenage Mutant Ninja Turtles (Rocksteady)
Tiny Toon Adventures (Calamity Coyote)

References

External links
Mitsuaki Hoshino at Arts Vision
 

1959 births
Living people
Male voice actors from Shizuoka Prefecture
Japanese male voice actors
20th-century Japanese male actors
21st-century Japanese male actors
Arts Vision voice actors